The Ministry of Industry and Trade is a government ministry of Tanzania. Its offices are located in Dar es Salaam. The Minister is Kitila Mkumbo.

History 
The Ministry was previously renamed to the Ministry of Industry, Trade and Investment under John Magufuli, seemingly absorbing the investment role previously undertaken by the Prime Minister's Office for Investment and Empowerment. In January 2019, the Prime Minister's office reabsorbed the responsibility for investments with the appointment of Angellah Jasmine Kairuki to the new role. Following this, the Ministry renamed back to Industry and Trade.

Ministers

References

External links
 

I
Tanzania
Tanzania
Industry in Tanzania